School of Military Engineering may refer to a training institution for military engineering such as:
Royal School of Military Engineering of the British Army
Canadian Forces School of Military Engineering of both the Canadian Army and the Royal Canadian Air Force
College of Military Engineering, Pune of the Indian Army
Military College of Engineering, Risalpur of the Pakistani Army
Sri Lanka School of Military Engineering of the Sri Lanka Army
New Zealand School of Military Engineering of the New Zealand Army
Military Engineering-Technical University of the Russian Army
School of Military Engineering of the Australian Army